Røværsholmen Lighthouse is a coastal lighthouse located in the Røvær islands in the municipality of Haugesund in Rogaland county, Norway.

History
The lighthouse was established in 1892 and automated in 1975. The lighthouse was listed as a protected site in 1998.

A two-story lighthouse keeper's house adjoins the lighthouse. The lower story of the house is stone and the upper story is wood.

See also

Lighthouses in Norway
List of lighthouses in Norway

References

External links
 Norsk Fyrhistorisk Forening 
 Picture of Røværsholmen Lighthouse

Lighthouses completed in 1892
Listed lighthouses in Norway
Lighthouses in Rogaland
Haugesund